Donald Rutherford  (22 September 1937 – 12/13 November 2016) was an  international rugby union player and administrator. He was the first ever Technical Director of the Rugby Football Union at Twickenham, becoming Director of Rugby where he served with distinction from 1969 – 1999.

During his career he played for St Luke's College, RAF, Combined Services, Percy Park, Wasps and Northumberland. However he is most closely associated with Gloucester and Gloucestershire for whom he played from 1964 to 1968.

He won fourteen caps for England, the first in 1960 against Wales, which England won 14–0; and toured Australia and New Zealand with the 1966 British Lions. He appeared for the Barbarians on a number of occasions between 1960 and 1968 including one as captain.

Early life
Don Rutherford trained as a physical education teacher at St Luke's College, Exeter. He did his National Service in the RAF. He played for the RAF and Combined Services and while still in the RAF he had his first England trial in 1958, playing for the Whites against the Colours (scrum half for the Colours in that trial was Micky Booth).

He had already joined Percy Park RFC in Northumberland and played for the club until 1963.

Rugby career
During that time Rutherford won his first four caps for England in the 1960 Five Nations tournament and appeared against South Africa at Twickenham in January 1961. He played an outstanding game for North East Counties against the All Blacks in January 1964.

At the end of the 1963–64 season Rutherford joined Gloucester. He made his debut for Gloucestershire in November 1964 and was selected for the first of the 1965 Home Internationals, scoring the winning points in a surprise win against France 9–6.
He was an ever-present for England in the Five Nations in 1964–65 and 1965–66.

He was selected to tour Australia and New Zealand with the British Lions. He played in the first of the two Internationals against Australia but on the New Zealand leg of the tour he broke his arm playing against Manuwatu, which required a metal plate and had to be flown home. He played once more for England against New Zealand in 1967.

Rutherford had a successful season for Gloucester and Gloucestershire in 1967–68. He captained the club, playing with remarkable consistency and scoring over 300 points. He broke his arm again playing for the Barbarians against Newport in April 1968 and he was advised to retire from the game.

Administration
While with Gloucester, Don Rutherford introduced a coaching creed that was continued in the successful years that followed under the captaincy of Dick Smith.

Rutherford became Technical Director of the Rugby Union in September 1969 – their first-ever professional appointment. In 30 years at the RFU he initiated coaching and playing programmes, which have been emulated by rugby playing countries across the world. He was made Director of Rugby and built up a nationwide structure, starting with mini-rugby through to the national team, providing a stream of playing talent.

He returned to Kingsholm in October 1973, having assembled an international team to play Gloucester in their centenary game.

Death
It was announced on 14 November 2016 that Rutherford had died over the previous weekend at the age of 79.

Awards
 OBE in 2000 in recognition of his services to rugby.
 Fellow of the British Institute of Sports Coaches (now N.C.F)
 Dyson Award in 1999 for Sportscoach
 Awarded Master of Education by the University of Leicester in 1980.

Publications
Written:
  Rugby for Coach and Player (1971) + Japanese Version (1974)
 Better Rugby / Even Better Rugby (1973 / 1985)
 A Guide for Players (1974)
 Teach Yourself Rugby (1975)
 Fitness Training For Rugby (1978) + 8 Wallcharts
 Mini Rugby – It's The Real Thing (1980) + Film
 England's Year – Part 1 & 2 (1980)
 France's Year (1980)
 International Rugby for Players (1983)
 Improving Backplay

Edited and written
 The RFU Preliminary, Intermediate and Coaching Awards (1970)
 RFU Education pack
 Even Better Rugby
 Positional Skills (10) – Revised / Rewritten (1974), compendium and 10 separate books on each position
 Fit to Referee and Touch Judge
 100 Years of Rugby – International Rugby Football Board
 Recruit or Die
 Mini Rugby Booklet
 Instigated the RFU Technical Journal (1994 – )

Video
 Play Rugby (1974) series of 10 films for BBC TV
 Better Rugby Series:
 Development of Skills
 Confidence in Contact
 Unit Skills
 The Coaches Programme
 Even Better Rugby
 Mini Rugby – It's the Real thing
 So You Want To Be A Referee?
 So You Want To Be A Better Referee?
 Rugby Series for the BBC (1973) – 10 programmes with Ray Williams (WRFU)
 Positional Skills – Backs – Full Back, Wing, Centre, Outside Half, Scrum Half (5 videos)
 Positional Skills – Forwards – Hooker, Props, Locks, Flanker, No.8 (5 videos)
 Back to the Future – The Wavell Wakefield Trust provides opportunities for young players to develop their skills.
 Running Rugby – The Wavell Wakefield Trust provides opportunities for young players to develop their skills.
 England Entertains the 1988 Wallabies – Highlights from games with comments from coaches
 Understanding the Game – The Winning Way – 4 editions
 Top Coaches – The Winning Edge
 Tries of the Season
 Behind The Scenes (1988 Wallabies)
 Recruit or Die
 RFU Museum “Twickenham”

References 

1937 births
2016 deaths
Barbarian F.C. players
British & Irish Lions rugby union players from England
Combined Services rugby union players
England international rugby union players
English cricketers
English rugby union coaches
English rugby union players
Gloucester Rugby players
Gloucestershire County RFU players
Northumberland cricketers
Officers of the Order of the British Empire
Royal Air Force airmen
Royal Air Force rugby union players
Rugby union fullbacks
Rugby union players from Tynemouth